Mix, mixes or mixing may refer to:

Audio and music
 Audio mixing (recorded music), the process of combining and balancing multiple sound sources
 DJ mix, a sequence of musical tracks mixed to appear as one continuous track

Mixtape, a compilation of songs or tracks
 Remix, a variation of a song
 Mix, short way to refer to the Mixolydian mode.
 Mix (magazine), a periodical for the professional recording and sound production technology industry

Albums 
 Mixes (Transvision Vamp album), 1992
 Mixes (Kylie Minogue album), a 1998 remix album by Australian singer-songwriter Kylie Minogue
 Mix (Stellar album), a 1999 studio album by New Zealand pop rock band Stellar
 Mixes, a 2008 self-released album by C418

Computing
 Mix (build tool), a build tool for working with the Elixir programming language
 MIX (email), a high performance email storage system for use with IMAP
 MIX, the computer and the instruction set architecture used in the textbook The Art of Computer Programming by Donald Knuth
 MIX (Microsoft), a discontinued annual Microsoft conference
 Mix network, an anonymous email system proposed by David Chaum in 1981
 Malta Internet Exchange, an Internet backbone for the country of Malta
 Milan Internet eXchange, in Milan, Italy
 MIX (Z39.87): NISO Metadata for Images in XML

Radio and television
 Mix FM (disambiguation)
 Mix (radio station), a radio station in New Zealand
 MIX (XM), a commercial-free channel on XM Satellite Radio
 Mix (Malaysian radio station), a radio station in Malaysia
 MixRadio, an online music streaming service
 Mix TV, a Brazilian television music channel aimed at young people
 Sky Sports Mix, a TV channel
 Sony Mix, an Indian television music channel

People

 Mix Diskerud (born 1990), Norwegian-American soccer player
 Mix (surname)

Places 

Mix camp, an informal settlement in Namibia
Mix, Louisiana, an unincorporated community
Mix Run, Pennsylvania, village

Science
 Mixing (mathematics), a concept in ergodic theory
 Mixing (physics), a descriptive condition of a dynamical system
 Mixing (process engineering), a unit operation for manipulating physical systems
 Crossbreeding, also called mixing, a genetic concept

Other
 MIX, the Roman numeral for the number 1009 or year 1009
 Microfinance Information Exchange (MIX), a non-profit business information provider in the microfinance sector
 MIX NYC, a nonprofit organization dedicated to queer experimental film
 Mix (manga), a 2012 baseball shōnen manga series by Mitsuru Adachi
 The Mix (charity), in the U.K.
 Mixed Doubles, also known as Mix, a 2017 Japanese film
 "Mixy" or "myxy", slang for the rabbit disease myxomatosis
 MIX, an Indonesian business magazine

See also
 
 
 The Mix (disambiguation)
 Mixe (disambiguation)
 Mixed (disambiguation)
 Mixer (disambiguation)
 Mixture (disambiguation)
 Mixx (disambiguation)